Carthage is a city in Leake County, Mississippi, United States. The population was 5,075 at the 2010 census. It is the county seat of Leake County.

The largest chicken processing plant in the world is located in Carthage.

History
Carthage was established in 1834, and became the county seat.  The Harris family were early settlers, and named the town after their former home of Carthage, Tennessee.  A courthouse and jail were built in 1836, and a post office was established the following year.  Carthage was incorporated in 1876.  A brick courthouse replaced the previous one in 1877, and was replaced again in 1910.  The Carthaginian newspaper was established in 1872, and remains in publication today.

By 1900, agriculture was the primary industry in Leake County. Although a railroad eventually ran through Carthage, it did not play a significant role in the development of the town. In 1914, the Merrill Brothers Logging Company built a logging railroad from Canton to McAfee, passing through Carthage. The line was taken over in 1927 by the Canton and Carthage Railroad, which then established commercial service to Carthage. The railroad was abandoned in 1960.

In 1927, Jackson's Daily Clarion Ledger wrote an article entitled "Carthage is a Good Progressive and Enterprising City - Thriving Center of Leake County Holds Modern Benefits".  By then, Carthage had schools, churches, an ice plant, two banks, a Masonic Hall, and a Coca-Cola bottling plant.

The population had surpassed 2,000 by 1964, and the town was reclassified as a city.

A large area known as the "Carthage Historic District", comprising commercial and residential properties of various architectural styles, is listed on the National Register of Historic Places.  The post office and the Jordan House are individually listed.

When Carthage, Texas established in 1848, it was named after Carthage, Mississippi.

Civil Rights Era
As early as 1948, Carthage began holding an annual "Tri-Racial Goodwill Festival", in which all citizens were included.  Although the directors of the first festival separated whites, African Americans and Native Americans, this was corrected in subsequent years.  The local newspaper reported that at the 1949 festival, "friendship and goodwill fellowship permeated the air".

In 1964, a group known as Americans for the Preservation of the White Race initiated a boycott in Carthage against white-owned businesses that were complying with the Civil Rights Act.  Also, when members of the Student Nonviolent Coordinating Committee tried to open a Freedom School in Carthage, local whites told them their deed was invalid, and threatened to burn the school.  In 1967, shots were fired into the home of an NAACP worker in Carthage.

Geography

Climate

Demographics

2020 census

As of the 2020 United States Census, there were 4,901 people, 1,359 households, and 1,024 families residing in the city.

2000 census
As of the census of 2000, there were 4,637 people, 1,490 households, and 1,065 families residing in the city. The population density was 495.9 people per square mile (191.5/km2). There were 1,654 housing units at an average density of 176.9 per square mile (68.3/km2). The racial makeup of the city was 52.86% White, 44.25% African American, 1.04% Native American, 0.43% Asian, 0.02% Pacific Islander, 0.58% from other races, and 0.82% from two or more races. Hispanic or Latino of any race were 1.94% of the population.

There were 1,490 households, out of which 37.1% had children under the age of 18 living with them, 43.8% were married couples living together, 23.6% had a female householder with no husband present, and 28.5% were non-families. 25.4% of all households were made up of individuals, and 13.5% had someone living alone who was 65 years of age or older. The average household size was 2.62 and the average family size was 3.12.

In the city, the population was spread out, with 26.1% under the age of 18, 11.7% from 18 to 24, 28.4% from 25 to 44, 18.1% from 45 to 64, and 15.7% who were 65 years of age or older. The median age was 33 years. For every 100 females, there were 98.6 males. For every 100 females age 18 and over, there were 96.4 males.

The median income for a household in the city was $25,052, and the median income for a family was $30,069. Males had a median income of $27,060 versus $17,280 for females. The per capita income for the city was $12,986. About 21.5% of families and 26.8% of the population were below the poverty line, including 39.6% of those under age 18 and 18.8% of those age 65 or over.

Economy
The largest chicken processing plant in the world—able to process 2.5 million chickens per week—is located on Highway 35 north of Carthage.  Originally owned by Choctaw Maid Farms, the plant was flanked by a large trailer park built in the mid-1990s to house the factory's growing Hispanic migrant workforce, and the Hispanic population of Carthage increased from 1.9 percent to 12.3 percent between 2000 and 2010.  The plant was purchased by Tyson Foods in 2003, and employs 1,700.

Arts and culture
The Square Affair is held annually each May, and features walks, runs, a children's fishing rodeo, an idol competition, vendors, fireworks, and a basketball tournament.

Parks and recreation
McMillian Park in Carthage has baseball diamonds, tennis courts, soccer field, disc golf course, two playgrounds, and a fishing pond. 

Lincoln Park in Carthage has a baseball diamond, basketball court, walking trail, and community center.

Education
The City of Carthage is served by the Leake County School District.

Infrastructure

Highways
Carthage is served by Mississippi Highway 35, Mississippi Highway 16, and Mississippi Highway 25.

Airport
The Carthage-Leake County Airport is located north of the city.

Law enforcement and fire
Carthage is protected by its own police and fire departments.

Health care
The Baptist Medical Center in Carthage provides hospital services and critical care.

Notable people
 The Chambers Brothers, soul music group
 Winson Hudson, civil rights activist
 John Johnson, professional basketball player, First Team All American at University of Iowa
 Ollie McLaughlin, record producer and record label owner
 Bennett Malone, member of Mississippi House of Representatives
 Marcus Mann, Southern Baptist minister and former college basketball player
 Jay Mathis, former member of the Mississippi House of Representatives
 Donald Rawson (1925-2014), history professor and administrator at Northwestern State University in Natchitoches, Louisiana, born in the former Dossville in Leake County
 Ferr Smith, member of the Mississippi House of Representatives
 Kenneth Walker, member of the Mississippi House of Representatives
 O'Neal Wilder, World Junior gold medalist

References

External links
 City of Carthage official website
 Leake County Chamber of Commerce
 Leake County School District
 The Carthaginian

Cities in Mississippi
Cities in Leake County, Mississippi
County seats in Mississippi
1834 establishments in Mississippi